is a PlayStation 2 video game based on the tokusatsu TV show Garo. It was published by Bandai and released in Japan on April 20, 2006.

Editions
Two versions of this game were released.
 Normal Edition
 contains the game disk, instruction manual, and standard pamphlets.
 Limited Edition
 in addition to the objects found in the Normal Edition, the Limited Edition came with a green 'Madou Fire' recolor of the metal Zaruba ring from "Equip and the Prop Vol. 1" Garo toy series.

Gameplay modes
 牙狼 Mode (Garo/Fanged Wolf Mode)
 暗黒騎士 Mode (Dark Knight Mode)
 Versus Mode
 五百年に一度の災い Mode (500-Year One Time Disaster Mode)
 Gallery Mode
 Options

Versus Mode characters
 Garo (Kouga)
 Garo (Taiga)
 Lost Soul Beast Garo
 Zero
 Kouga Saejima
 Taiga Saejima
 Rei Suzumura
 Kodama
 Ishutarb
 Lunarken
 Moloch
 Humpty
 Dantarian
 Gargoyle
 Kiba

Theme songs
"Theme of Garo" by TRYFORCE

References
Official website from Bandai

2006 video games
Garo (TV series)
Japan-exclusive video games
Fighting games
PlayStation 2-only games
PlayStation 2 games
Video games developed in Japan

Bandai games
Multiplayer and single-player video games